Aleksander Saharov (born 22 April 1982, in Türi) is a former Estonian professional footballer and current beach soccer player.

Beach soccer
In 2009, after ending his professional football career, he started to play beach soccer in Unibet/Nõmme Kalju. He currently plays in Estonia national beach soccer team.

International career
During his national team career he was capped 25 times and scored 1 goal. He made his debut on 26 April 2000 against Luxembourg in a Friendly match. He scored his only goal on 20 April 2005 against Norway in a Friendly match.

International goals

Personal
He is 1.71 m tall and weighs 68 kg.

References

External links
 Aleksander Saharov lõpetas Meistriliiga karjääri 

1982 births
Living people
People from Türi
Estonian footballers
Estonia international footballers
Estonian people of Russian descent
Nõmme Kalju FC players
Viljandi JK Tulevik players
FC Flora players
FC Valga players
Estonian beach soccer players
Association football wingers